{{DISPLAYTITLE:C7H14}}
The molecular formula C7H14 (molar mass: 98.19 g/mol, exact mass: 98.1096 u) may refer to:

 Cycloheptane
 Heptene
 Methylcyclohexane

Molecular formulas